Augustinius Neldal Lossius (1 January 1787 – 15 July 1864) was a Norwegian jurist and politician.

He was elected to the Norwegian Parliament in 1818. He represented the constituency of Romsdals Amt, where he worked as a district stipendiary magistrate. He served only one term.

References

Norwegian jurists
Members of the Storting
Møre og Romsdal politicians
1787 births
1864 deaths